The following is a list of episodes of Richard the Lionheart, a family television show based loosely on the life of Richard I which aired between 1962 and 1963.

Episodes

Lists of British drama television series episodes